The Ole Miss Rebels women's basketball team represents the University of Mississippi in women's basketball. The school competes in the Southeastern Conference (SEC) in Division I of the National Collegiate Athletic Association (NCAA). The Rebels play home basketball games at The Pavilion at Ole Miss near the campus in University, Mississippi.

Rebels in the WNBA draft

Postseason results

NCAA Division I
The Rebels have appeared in the NCAA Division I women's basketball tournament 18 times. Their combined record is 18–18.

WNIT results
The Rebels have appeared in the Women's National Invitation Tournament 8 times. Their combined record is 8–8.

AIAW Division I
The Rebels made one appearance in the AIAW National Division I basketball tournament, with a combined record of 0–1.

Season-by-season record
The Rebels started play on December 3, 1974, playing Itawamba Junior College, losing 76–75. They won their first ever game the next day over Blue Mountain 85–56. They reached their first national tournament in 1978, though they lost to Queens College 74–71. They were invited to their first NCAA Tournament in 1982. From 1984 to 2007, the Rebels reached the Elite Eight five times, four happening under Van Chancellor. Ole Miss has won just one conference title, winning the regular season title in 1992, though they fell in the SEC Tournament Semifinals.

On January 30, 2020, Ole Miss tied the record for least points scored in a half with 2 during a home game against South Carolina.

References

External links